Brand New World is Noah Gundersen's first CD released under his own name. It features his sister, Abby Gundersen, singing backup vocals and playing the violin, and Michael Porter playing an additional guitar.

Track listing
 "Brand New World" - 4:48
 "Moss On A Rolling Stone" - 4:53
 "Burning Fences" - 5:03
 "The First Song" - 4:53
 "Winter" - 6:18
 "The Current State of Things" - 5:11

Personnel
Noah Gundersen - vocals/guitar
Abby Gundersen - violin/string composition
Michael Porter - backup guitar

References

External links
 Noah Gundersen Music - Listen for Free and Download

2009 EPs
Noah Gundersen albums